The William H. Grant House, also known as Sheltering Arms Hospital, is a historic house located in Richmond, Virginia. It was built in 1857, and is a large, three-story brick townhouse in the Italianate style. It features a small, richly ornamented arched front porch supported by coupled square columns.  In 1892, the house was acquired by the Sheltering Arms Hospital, who occupied it until 1965.  It is connected to the Benjamin Watkins Leigh House.

It was listed on the National Register of Historic Places in 1969.

Currently, the building is owned by Virginia Commonwealth University and houses office space for the Department of Dermatology and Risk Management unit.

References

Houses on the National Register of Historic Places in Virginia
Italianate architecture in Virginia
Houses completed in 1857
Houses in Richmond, Virginia
National Register of Historic Places in Richmond, Virginia
1857 establishments in Virginia